The 1937 Women's Western Open was a golf competition held at Beverly Country Club, the 8th edition of the event. Helen Hicks won the championship in match play competition by defeating Bea Barrett in the final match, 6 and 5.

Women's Western Open
Golf in Chicago
Women's Western Open
Women's Western Open
Women's Western Open
Women in Chicago
Women's sports in Illinois
1930s in Chicago